Çamdibi can refer to:

 Çamdibi, Kuyucak
 Çamdibi, Refahiye
 Çamdibi (İzmir Metro)